Grzeszyn may refer to the following places in Poland:
Grzeszyn, Lower Silesian Voivodeship (south-west Poland)
Grzeszyn, Łódź Voivodeship (central Poland)